Coursey is a surname. Notable people with the surname include:

Cecil Calvert Coursey (1898–1956), American architect 
Chris Coursey (born 1954), American politician and journalist
John P. Coursey (1914–1992), American brigadier general
Will Coursey (born 1978), American politician